is a dam on the Nagasaki River in Kurihara, Miyagi Prefecture, Japan, completed in 2005.

References 

Dams in Miyagi Prefecture
Dams completed in 2005